Homer Augustus Nelson (August 31, 1829 –  April 25, 1891) was an American politician and soldier from the state of New York. He served one term in the U.S. House of Representative and was an officer in the Union Army during the first part of the Civil War and a United States congressman during the latter half of the war.

Early life and education 
Nelson was born in Poughkeepsie, New York, where he was also raised and educated. He studied law and was admitted to the bar, commencing practice in Poughkeepsie.

Judicial career 
He was a judge of Dutchess County, New York from 1855 to 1862.

Civil War 
At the outbreak of the Civil War, he became colonel of the 159th New York Volunteer Infantry.

Political career 
He left in 1863 when he took his seat in the 38th United States Congress, but was unsuccessful for reelection in 1864.

Following the war, he was a delegate to the New York State Constitutional Convention in 1867 and the same year was elected Secretary of State of New York serving until 1871. He was a member of the New York State Senate (15th D.) in 1882 and 1883; and was appointed to the commission to report a revision of the judiciary article of the New York Constitution in 1890.

Death and burial 
He died on April 25, 1891 in Poughkeepsie and was interred in Poughkeepsie Rural Cemetery.

External links

1829 births
1891 deaths
People of New York (state) in the American Civil War
Union Army colonels
Secretaries of State of New York (state)
Democratic Party New York (state) state senators
New York (state) lawyers
Politicians from Poughkeepsie, New York
Burials at Poughkeepsie Rural Cemetery
Democratic Party members of the United States House of Representatives from New York (state)
19th-century American politicians
19th-century American lawyers